The 2018 Stephen F. Austin football team represented Stephen F. Austin State University in the 2018 NCAA Division I FCS football season. The Lumberjacks were led by interim head coach Jeff Byrd and played their home games at Homer Bryce Stadium. They were a member of the Southland Conference. They finished the season 2–8, 2–7 in Southland play to finish in tenth place.

On June 18, head coach Clint Conque was suspended indefinitely pending an investigation into alleged violations of university policy. On August 6, Conque announced his resignation from SFA.

Previous season
The Lumberjacks finished the 2017 season 4–7, 4–5 in Southland play to finish in a tie for sixth place.

Preseason

Preseason All-Conference Teams
On July 12, 2018, the Southland announced their Preseason All-Conference Teams, with the Lumberjacks having five players selected at six positions.

Defense First Team
 Alize Ward – Jr. DB

Offense Second Team
 Tamrick Pace – Jr. WR
 Alize Ward – Jr. all purpose player
 Caleb Lewallen – Sr. P

Defense Second Team
 Ryan Woods – Sr. LB
 Trenton Gordon – So. DB

Preseason Poll
On July 19, 2018, the Southland announced their preseason poll, with the Lumberjacks predicted to finish in sixth place.

Schedule

Source:

Game summaries

at Mississippi State

Abilene Christian

at McNeese State

vs Sam Houston State

Central Arkansas

at Houston Baptist

Lamar

at Nicholls State

Northwestern State

References

Stephen F. Austin
Stephen F. Austin Lumberjacks football seasons
Stephen F. Austin Lumberjacks football